Elisabeth Dorothea of Saxe-Gotha-Altenburg (8 January 1640 – 24 August 1709), was a German regent. She was Landgravine of Hesse-Darmstadt by marriage to Louis VI, Landgrave of Hesse-Darmstadt, and Regent of Hesse-Darmstadt during the minority of her son from 1678 to 1688.

Early life

Elisabeth Dorothea was the eldest daughter and eldest surviving child of Ernest I, Duke of Saxe-Gotha and Elisabeth Sophie, the only daughter of John Philip, Duke of Saxe-Altenburg.

Six years after her marriage, her father inherited the Duchy of Saxe-Altenburg and assumed new arms and titles.

Landgravine

On 5 December 1666, Elisabeth Dorothea married Louis VI, Landgrave of Hesse-Darmstadt at Schloss Friedenstein at Gotha. The groom was a close friend of her brother Prince Frederick and a widowed father of six children. She bore her husband eight further children, two daughters and six sons; one died in infancy and another was killed in battle ten months before her own death.

Landgrave Louis VI died on 24 April 1678 and was succeeded by the eldest son of his first marriage, Louis VII, who reigned only 18 weeks and 4 days before dying of dysentery on 31 August 1678 in Gotha.

Regent
Like his father, Louis VII designated his stepmother as regent of Hesse-Darmstadt in his will. The Imperial Court (Reichskammergericht) demanded that she reign jointly with a group of councillors led by Weiprecht von Gemmingen, but the politically wise and energetic Elisabeth prevented them from taking their oaths; this relegated them to the position of advisors and allowed her free rein. Darmstadt flourished under her rule.

On the death of William Christoph, Landgrave of Hesse-Homburg in 1681, Elisabeth Dorothea successfully challenged the Homburg branch of the family over ownership of Bingenheim Castle, claiming that the area rightfully belonged to the Darmstadt branch because it had been given to Princess Sophia Eleonore of Hesse-Darmstadt as a dowry when she married William Christoph, Landgrave of Hesse-Homburg.

After her son attained his majority in 1688, she retired to her dower lands in Butzbach but offered her help in the government to her son, who refused. She died in Butzbach in 1709.

She kept a diary for some time before abandoning it in 1667. Although she left only 52 pages worth of entries, the diary is considered a valuable view into the world of the German courts.

Ancestry

References

Bibliography
 Puppel Pauline, Die Regentin p. 279.
 Curtius Michael Conrad, Geschichte ... von Hessen p. 257.
Roloff Hans Gert, Chloe  - Beihefte zum Daphnis Bd. 25 Editiondesiderate der frühen Neuzeit Editions Rodopi B. V., Amsterdam.

 

  

1640 births
1709 deaths
People from Saxe-Gotha
Landgravines of Hesse-Darmstadt
Princesses of Saxe-Gotha-Altenburg
House of Hesse-Darmstadt
17th-century women rulers
German female regents
Women diarists
17th-century German women writers
Daughters of monarchs